Thambi Thanga Kambi is a 1988 Indian Tamil-language action film directed by K. Shankar and produced by S. Ganesh. The film stars Vijayakanth, Lakshmi, Ramya Krishnan and Rekha. It was released on 15 July 1988.

Plot 

Shankar lives with his mother and sister and comes from a poor family. As his ailing mother's situation becomes critical, Shankar accepts a job as auto-driver for a while. Meanwhile, a mysterious rich woman Ganga employs Shankar for a cause, knowing his struggling family in order to earn much more money. He accepts his decision. She sends in the vicinity of Periya Durai and Jambulingam. Chithra and Uma also visited their family. The rest and how Shankar helps Ganga to find the solutions to her family problems.

Cast 
 Vijayakanth as Shankar
 Lakshmi as Ganga (Kaveri)
 Ramya Krishnan as Chithra
 Rekha as Uma
 M. N. Nambiar as Thyagu
 Radha Ravi as Periya Durai
 Manorama as Auto driver owner
 Malaysia Vasudevan as Jambulingam
 Nizhalgal Ravi as Chinna Durai
 Jai Ganesh as Pasupathy
 Vadivukkarasi as Shankar's mother
 Kovai Sarala
 Senthil as Karuppu
 Charle as Madhu
 Kullamani
 Disco Shanti in a special appearance

Production 
Thambi Thanga Kambi, an action film, was a departure from the Hindu mythological films director K. Shankar was generally known for. It was produced by S. Ganesh under Sankaralaya Pictures.

Soundtrack 
The music is composed by Gangai Amaran.

Release and reception 
Thambi Thanga Kambi was released on 15 July 1988. A week later, The Indian Express derisively called it a "garish commercial film", but said the climax sequence was "ambitiously shot".

References

External links 
 

1980s Tamil-language films
1988 action films
1988 films
Films directed by K. Shankar
Films scored by Gangai Amaran
Indian action films